GDB may refer to:

GDB Human Genome Database
GNU Debugger, a free and open-source debugger developed by the GNU Project
Guide Dogs for the Blind, US
.gdb, a filename extension used by ArcGIS Geodatabase
Puerto Rico Government Development Bank
Graph database, using graph structures